Julius Bar can refer to:
Julius (New York City), a historic gay bar in New York City
Julius Baer Group, a Swiss bank founded by Julius Bär